This article is a list of notable individuals who were born in and/or have lived in La Junta, Colorado.

Academia

Arts and entertainment
 William Charles Anderson (1920–2003), novelist, screenwriter
 J. F. Burshears (1909–1987), Koshare Indian Dancers founder
 James Erb (1926–2014), composer, conductor, arranger
 Ken Kesey (1935–2001), novelist, essayist
 The Space Lady (1948– ), singer-songwriter, musician

Military
 Wendell Fertig (1900–1975), U.S. Army Colonel, World War II guerrilla leader
 Ambrosio Guillen (1929–1953), U.S. Marine Corps Staff Sergeant, Medal of Honor recipient

Politics

National
 Lewis Babcock (1943– ), U.S. federal judge
 Linda Smith (1950– ), U.S. Representative from Washington

State
 Judy Burges (1943– ), Arizona state legislator
 C. A. Robins (1884–1970), 22nd Governor of Idaho

Sports

American football
 Larry Elliott (1935–2008), coach
 Dustin Osborn (1984– ), wide receiver
 Eugene Reusser (1922–2010), coach

Baseball
 Tippy Martinez (1950– ), pitcher
 Mike Oquist (1968– ), pitcher

Other
 Lane Frost (1963–1989), rodeo bull rider

References

La Junta, Colorado
La Junta